Green Township is one of the sixteen townships of Brown County, Ohio, United States. The 2010 census found 3,652 people in the township.

Geography
Located in the northern extension of the county, it borders the following townships:
Perry Township - north
Salem Township, Highland County - northeast
Clay Township, Highland County - east
Washington Township - southeast corner
Pike Township - south
Sterling Township - west

Part of the village of Mount Orab is located in southwestern Green Township.

Name and history
Green Township was established in 1834. It is named from a thicket of green bushes near the home of a pioneer settler.

It is one of sixteen Green Townships statewide.

Government
The township is governed by a three-member board of trustees, who are elected in November of odd-numbered years to a four-year term beginning on the following January 1. Two are elected in the year after the presidential election and one is elected in the year before it. There is also an elected township fiscal officer, who serves a four-year term beginning on April 1 of the year after the election, which is held in November of the year before the presidential election. Vacancies in the fiscal officership or on the board of trustees are filled by the remaining trustees.

References

External links
County website

Townships in Brown County, Ohio
1834 establishments in Ohio
Populated places established in 1834
Townships in Ohio